Debani is a settlement in Kenya's Busia County.

References 

Populated places in Western Province (Kenya)
Busia County